John George Chedid (Arabic: جون جورج شديد) (born on July 4, 1923 in Edde, Lebanon – died on March 21, 2012) was a Lebanese-born American Maronite hierarch. He served as the first Bishop of the Maronite Catholic Eparchy of Our Lady of Lebanon of Los Angeles from 1994 until his retirement in 2000.

Life
Born in Lebanon, John Chedid received after ten years of study in Rome on 21 December 1951 his priestly ordination of the Apostolic Exarchate of the United States of America. On September 1, 1955 he joined the succession of Thomas Aiken as pastor of the parish of Our Lady of Mt. Lebanon in Los Angeles. In 1969 he was made Monsignor and named Honorary Chaplain to His Holiness. On November 12, 1978 he was ordained a Chorbishop.

Pope John Paul II appointed him on 13 October 1980 titular bishop of Callinicum dei Maroniti and ordered him to auxiliary bishop in the diocese of Saint Maroun of Brooklyn. Maronite Patriarch of Antioch, Anthony Peter Khoraish, ordained him on January 25, 1981 to the episcopate and his co-consecrators were Francis Mansour Zayek, Eparch of Saint Maron of Brooklyn, and Nasrallah Boutros Sfeir, Auxiliary Bishop of Antioch.

Chedid was ordained as the first Bishop of the Maronite Catholic Eparchy of Our Lady of Lebanon of Los Angeles at the Our Lady of Lebanon Cathedral in Los Angeles, California, on February 19, 1994, by Archbishop Francis Mansour Zayek. He served until he reached the mandatory retirement age of 80. His resignation due to age was accepted by Pope John Paul II on November 20, 2000, and he was succeeded by the second bishop, Robert Joseph Shaheen.

Bishop John George Chedid died on March 21, 2012, at the age of 88.

References

External links
 http://www.gcatholic.org/dioceses/diocese/olle0.htm

1923 births
2012 deaths
20th-century Maronite Catholic bishops
American Maronites
Lebanese emigrants to the United States
Lebanese Maronites